Volodymyr Postolatyev (born 25 August 1979) is a Ukrainian former professional footballer who played as a striker.

Postolatyev is the product of the Lviv Sportive School System. He spent a large part of his career as a player in different clubs of the Ukrainian First League and the Ukrainian Premier League.

Honours
Individual
 Desna Chernihiv Player of the Year: 2008

References

External links

1979 births
Living people
Ukrainian footballers
Expatriate footballers in Uzbekistan
Ukrainian expatriate footballers
FC Desna Chernihiv players
FC Zirka Kropyvnytskyi players
FC Hoverla Uzhhorod players
FC Zorya Luhansk players
FC Oleksandriya players
FC Spartak Ivano-Frankivsk players
FC Obolon-Brovar Kyiv players
SC Tavriya Simferopol players
FC Arsenal-Kyivshchyna Bila Tserkva players
Ukrainian Premier League players
Association football forwards